Saint-Frézal-de-Ventalon is a former commune in the Lozère department in southern France. On 1 January 2016, it was merged into the new commune of Ventalon-en-Cévennes.

See also
Communes of the Lozère department

References

Saintfrezaldeventalon